Hymenocrater is a genus of plants from the mint family. It is native to central and southwestern Asia from Turkey to Turkmenistan and Pakistan.

Species
Hymenocrater adenothrix Rech.f. - Afghanistan
Hymenocrater altimuranus Rech.f. - Afghanistan
Hymenocrater bituminosus Fisch. & C.A.Mey. - Turkey, Iran, Caucasus
Hymenocrater calycinus (Boiss.) Benth.  - Turkmenistan, Iran
Hymenocrater elegans Bunge - Turkmenistan, Iran
Hymenocrater incanus Bunge - Iran
Hymenocrater inciaidentatus Boriss. - Turkmenistan
Hymenocrater longiflorus Benth. - Iran, Iraq
Hymenocrater oxyodontus Rech.f. - Iran
Hymenocrater platystegius Rech.f. - Iran
Hymenocrater sessilifolius Benth. - Afghanistan, Iran, Pakistan
Hymenocrater yazdianus Rech.f. - Iran

References

Lamiaceae
Lamiaceae genera